"Stop Her on Sight (S.O.S.)" is a song written in 1966 by Albert Hamilton, Richard Morris, and Edwin Starr. It was initially released by Starr as a single in the United States in January that year on Ric-Tic Records. The track was released on Polydor Records in the UK in April 1966. 

The track was produced by co-writer Richard Morris and Al Kent, using the popular elements of the Motown Sound. It was Starr's third consecutive chart hit, following on from his earlier releases of "Agent OO Soul" and "Back Street". AllMusic noted that "everything about this record is remarkably crisp".

The track was popular on the UK's Northern soul scene. As of August 2022, copies of the original vinyl single sell online for in excess of £35 ($43).

Various cover versions of the song were recorded by Deon Jackson (1966), Long John Baldry (Looking at Long John, 1966), Bob Kuban and the In-Men (1966), Cliff Bennett and the Rebel Rousers (1967), The Foundations (1968), Alan Caddy Orchestra & Singers (1970), and Rare Earth (1978) among others.

Charts

References

External links

Edwin Starr songs
1966 singles
1966 songs
Songs written by Richard Morris (songwriter)
Songs written by Edwin Starr
Northern soul songs
Ric-Tic Records artists